Snir Dori (born August 4, 1987), is an Israeli football goalkeeper. Dori began to play in Hapoel Petah Tikva youth teams in 1997. He moved up from the under-16 team to the youth team of the club in 2007–08 and to the first team in 2009.

In 2013 after serving as the captain of the team Dori moved for the first time and sign a contract in Maccabi Netanya.
During his 3 seasons at Maccabi Netanya in which he helped the team to qualify to the Israeli premier League and for the Israeli state cup final, Dori came back to his home club and signed a new contract with Hapoel Petah Tikva

References

External links 
 

1987 births
Living people
20th-century Israeli Jews
21st-century Israeli Jews
Israeli footballers
Hapoel Petah Tikva F.C. players
Maccabi Netanya F.C. players
Hapoel Herzliya F.C. players
Liga Leumit players
Israeli Premier League players
Association football goalkeepers
Footballers from Petah Tikva
Jewish Israeli sportspeople